Ole Erevik (born 9 January 1981) is a Norwegian retired handball player.

He participated with the Norwegian national team at the 2005, 2007, 2009, 2011 and 2017 World Men's Handball Championship and at the 2006, 2008, 2010, 2012, 2014 and 2016 European Men's Handball Championship.

References

External links

1981 births
Living people
Sportspeople from Stavanger
Norwegian male handball players
Expatriate handball players
Norwegian expatriate sportspeople in Denmark
Norwegian expatriate sportspeople in Germany
Norwegian expatriate sportspeople in Spain
Norwegian expatriate sportspeople in France
Handball-Bundesliga players
Liga ASOBAL players
KIF Kolding players
CB Ademar León players
Aalborg Håndbold players